Live at the Village Vanguard may refer to:

George Adams & Don Pullen
 Live at the Village Vanguard (George Adams & Don Pullen album), 1983
 Live at the Village Vanguard Vol. 2, 1983

Kenny Burrell
 A Night at the Vanguard, 1959
 Kenny Burrell Live at the Village Vanguard, 1978

John Coltrane
 Live! at the Village Vanguard, 1962
 Live at the Village Vanguard Again!, 1966

Bill Evans
 Sunday at the Village Vanguard, 1961
 Turn Out the Stars: The Final Village Vanguard Recordings, 1996
 The Complete Village Vanguard Recordings, 1961, 2005

Elvin Jones

 Live at the Village Vanguard (Elvin Jones album), 1968
 Live at the Village Vanguard Volume One, 1984

Hank Jones, Ron Carter and Tony Williams
 The Great Jazz Trio at the Village Vanguard, 1977
 The Great Jazz Trio at the Village Vanguard Vol. 2, 1977
 The Great Jazz Trio at the Village Vanguard Again, 2000

Joe Lovano
 Quartets: Live at the Village Vanguard, 1994
 On This Day ... Live at the Vanguard, 2003

Brad Mehldau
 Live at the Village Vanguard: The Art of the Trio Volume Two, 1998
 Art of the Trio 4: Back at the Vanguard, 1999
 Brad Mehldau Trio Live, recorded 2006, released 2008

Paul Motian
 At the Village Vanguard, 1995
 Live at the Village Vanguard (Paul Motian album), 2007
 Live at the Village Vanguard Vol. II (Paul Motian album), 2008
 Live at the Village Vanguard Vol. III, 2011

Junko Onishi
 Live at the Village Vanguard (Junko Onishi album), 1994
 Live at the Village Vanguard Vol. II (Junko Onishi album), 1995

Art Pepper
 Thursday Night at the Village Vanguard, 1979
 Friday Night at the Village Vanguard, 1979
 Saturday Night at the Village Vanguard, 1979
 More for Les at the Village Vanguard, 1985

Chris Potter
 Lift: Live at the Village Vanguard, 2004
 Follow the Red Line: Live at the Village Vanguard, 2007

Christian McBride
 Live at the Village Vanguard (2015 Christian McBride album)
 Live at the Village Vanguard (2021 Christian McBride album)

Others
 Live at the Village Vanguard (Geri Allen album), 1990
 Live at the Village Vanguard (Uri Caine Trio album), 2004
 Live at the Village Vanguard (Dizzy Gillespie album), 1967
 Panorama: Live at the Village Vanguard, Jim Hall, 1997
 Live at the Village Vanguard (Tom Harrell album), 2002
 Folklore: Live at the Village Vanguard, Vincent Herring, 1993
 Live at the Village Vanguard (The Thad Jones / Mel Lewis Orchestra album), 1967
Fire! Live at the Village Vanguard, David Newman, 1990
 Live at the Village Vanguard (Michel Petrucciani album), 1984
 Spirit of the Moment - Live at the Village Vanguard, Joshua Redman, 1995
 Live at the Village Vanguard (Marc Ribot album), 2014
 Live at the Village Vanguard (Red Rodney album), 1980
 Stepping Stones: Live at the Village Vanguard, Woody Shaw, 1978
 McCoy Tyner Plays John Coltrane: Live at the Village Vanguard, 2001
 Live at the Village Vanguard (Chucho Valdes album), 2000
 The Git Go - Live at the Village Vanguard, Mal Waldron, 1987
 Alive at the Village Vanguard, Fred Hirsch & Esperanza Spalding, 2023

…at the Village Vanguard
 Charlie Byrd at the Village Vanguard, 1961
 Betty Carter at the Village Vanguard, 1970
 Junior Mance Trio at the Village Vanguard, 1961
 Gerry Mulligan and the Concert Jazz Band at the Village Vanguard, 1960
 A Night at the Village Vanguard, Sonny Rollins, 1957

…at the Vanguard
 Nights at the Vanguard, Tommy Flanagan, 1986
 Sunday Night at the Vanguard, Fred Hersch, 2016
 Hi Jinx at the Vanguard, Red Rodney and Ira Sullivan, 1984

See also
 Village Vanguard, New York